Hypargyria is a genus of snout moths. It was described by Émile Louis Ragonot in 1888.

Species
 Hypargyria definitella (Zeller, 1881) (from South America, Caribbean)
 Hypargyria impecuniosa de Joannis, 1927 (from Mozambique)
 Hypargyria metalliferella Ragonot, 1888 (Africa, southern Asia, Australia)
 Hypargyria slossonella (Hulst, 1900) (Florida & Mexico)

References

Phycitini
Pyralidae genera
Taxa named by Émile Louis Ragonot